Dawson's Cove, also known as Sandyville, is a small settlement, about 2 km away from the small outport community of Hermitage, that is a neighborhood of the town of Hermitage-Sandyville. Located on the southern shore of Newfoundland, Dawson's Cove is in Connaigre Bay, a finger-like projection of Newfoundland's Fortune Bay.

The town currently has an approximate population of around 60. 
The Dawson's Cove Post Office closed on September 13, 1966.

See also
 List of communities in Newfoundland and Labrador

Populated places in Newfoundland and Labrador